Kandal (also Romanized as Kandāl; also known as Mazra‘eh-ye Kandāl) is a village in Sarfaryab Rural District, Sarfaryab District, Charam County, Kohgiluyeh and Boyer-Ahmad Province, Iran. At the 2006 census, its population was 44, in 7 families.

References 

Populated places in Charam County